Renaissance Coliseum is a multi-purpose athletic facility at Bradley University in Peoria, Illinois.  Renaissance Coliseum was originally intended to be completed in 2009, but construction delays pushed back the opening to the 2010–11 academic year. The official dedication took place on October 15, 2010.  Renaissance Coliseum houses athletic offices, practice, training/conditioning facilities, the athletics hall of fame and other features. Adjacent to the arena is the men's basketball practice facility. In addition to hosting Bradley Athletics events, the facility will welcome concerts, speakers, commencement, IHSA competitions, and other events local to Central Illinois.

After the demolition of Robertson Memorial Field House, the 4,200-seat arena was needed to host sports that don't require the larger Carver Arena. Because of the delays, the Bradley teams moved to Lorene Ramsey Gymnasium at nearby Illinois Central College for the 2009–2010 season.

Concerts the arena has hosted over the years include:  Weezer, Jason Derulo, Mike Posner, Taking Back Sunday, Girl Talk, The Band Perry, Plain White T's, The Fray, and Macklemore & Ryan Lewis.

In 2012, the Bradley University Men's Basketball team played its first regular season home game on campus since 1982.  The team has continued to schedule at least one regular season home game at the arena since then.  Bradley played two home games of the CIT postseason tournament at the Coliseum, defeating both the University of Wisconsin-Green Bay and Tulane.

See also
 List of NCAA Division I basketball arenas

References

External links
Stadium information
Bradley University Arena

Basketball venues in Illinois
College basketball venues in the United States
College volleyball venues in the United States
Indoor arenas in Illinois
Volleyball venues in Illinois
Arena
Buildings and structures in Peoria, Illinois
Sports venues in Peoria, Illinois
2010 establishments in Illinois
Sports venues completed in 2010